Pelle is a Swedish diminutive of the name Per, a variation of the name Peter. It was the No. 351-ranked name in popularity in the Netherlands in 2015.

Direct translations 
Italian: pelle – skin
French: Pellé – nickname for a bald old man
Middle Low German: Pelle – precious purple silk cloth
Finnish: pelle – clown

Meaning of the name
Pelle is a Scandinavian pet form of the name 'Per'. Forms of this name deriving from other languages include 'Petter' and 'Peter'.

Peter is a common masculine given name. It is derived, via Latin petra, from the Greek word πέτρος (petros) meaning 'stone' or 'rock'.

People
Pelle Strindlund (born 1971), Swedish writer and animal rights advocate
Howlin Pelle Almqvist (born 1978), Swedish singer, frontman of The Hives

See also
Pele (name), given name and surname

References

Masculine given names
Swedish masculine given names